The 2018–19 Baltic Men Volleyball League, known as Credit 24 Champions League for sponsorship reasons, was the 14th edition of the highest level of club volleyball in the Baltic states.

Participating teams

The following teams took part in the 2018–19 edition of Baltic Men Volleyball League.

Venues and personnel

Main Tournament
All participating 11 clubs were playing according to the double round robin system.

|}
Updated to match(es) played on 17 February 2019. Source: Credit24 Champions League Regular Season

Playoffs
The four winners of each series qualified to the Final Four, while the other four teams were eliminated.

Final four
Organizer: Bigbank Tartu 
Venue: University of Tartu Sports Hall, Tartu, Estonia

Semifinals

|}

3rd place match

|}

Final

|}

Final ranking

Final four awards

Most Valuable Player
  Hindrek Pulk (Bigbank Tartu) 
Best Setter
  Artis Caics (Saaremaa)
Best Outside Hitters
  Illia Kovalov (Pärnu)
  Aleksandrs Avdejevs (RTU/Robežsardze)

Best Middle Blockers
  Meelis Kivivild (Bigbank Tartu) 
  Harri Palmar (Saaremaa)
Best Opposite Hitter
  Siim Põlluäär (Saaremaa)
Best Libero
  Rait Rikberg (Bigbank Tartu)

References

External links
Official website

Baltic Men Volleyball League
Baltic Men Volleyball League
Baltic Men Volleyball League
Baltic Men Volleyball League
Baltic Men Volleyball League
Baltic Men Volleyball League
Baltic Men Volleyball League
Baltic Men Volleyball League